Saxonia may refer to:

 Latin for Saxony
 Saxonia (locomotive), first locomotive built in Germany in 1838
 British Rail Class 40 diesel locomotive D229, built by English Electric at Newton-le-Willows, Lancashire
 , more than one passenger ship of the Cunard Line
 The Saxonia Guest House in Somerset, England, featured on the show The Hotel Inspector

See also 
 Saxon (disambiguation)
 Saxony (disambiguation)